Mike Hogan (born 9 May 1943) is a British hurdler. He competed in the men's 400 metres hurdles at the 1964 Summer Olympics.

References

1943 births
Living people
Athletes (track and field) at the 1964 Summer Olympics
British male hurdlers
Olympic athletes of Great Britain
Place of birth missing (living people)
Universiade silver medalists for Great Britain
Universiade bronze medalists for Great Britain
Universiade medalists in athletics (track and field)
Medalists at the 1963 Summer Universiade